The 2022 Fanatec GT World Challenge Australia Powered by AWS is an Australian motor sport competition for GT cars. The series incorporates the "Motorsport Australia GT Championship", the "Motorsport Australia Endurance Championship", the "GT3 Trophy Series" and the "GT4 Cup". The Motorsport Australia GT Championship is the 26th running of an Australian GT Championship. This is the second season of the championship being jointly managed by Australian Racing Group (ARG) and SRO Motorsports Group.

Calendar
The provisional six-race calendar was released on 1 March 2022 with all rounds taking place in Australia. The season was to begin on 18 March at Phillip Island Grand Prix Circuit and will end on 4 December at the Adelaide Street Circuit in Adelaide. In August, it was announced that Adelaide would join the calendar as final round, replacing the cancelled May round at Sydney Motorsport Park.

Entry list

Race results
Bold indicates the overall winner.

See also
2022 British GT Championship
2022 GT World Challenge Europe
2022 GT World Challenge Europe Sprint Cup
2022 GT World Challenge Europe Endurance Cup
2022 GT World Challenge Asia
2022 GT World Challenge America
2022 Intercontinental GT Challenge

References

External links

Australian GT Championship
GT World Challenge Australia